Come Mankasse was a candidate in the 2002 Republic of the Congo presidential election who stood for the Congolese Union of Republicans. He gained 1.25% of the vote.

References

Congolese Union of Republicans politicians
Living people
Year of birth missing (living people)
Place of birth missing (living people)
21st-century Republic of the Congo politicians